Year 218 (CCXVIII) was a common year starting on Thursday (link will display the full calendar) of the Julian calendar. At the time, it was known as the Year of the Consulship of Severus and Adventus (or, less frequently, year 971 Ab urbe condita). The denomination 218 for this year has been used since the early medieval period, when the Anno Domini calendar era became the prevalent method in Europe for naming years.

Events

By place

Roman Empire 
 May 16 – Julia Maesa, an aunt of the assassinated Emperor Caracalla, is banished to her home in Syria by the self-proclaimed emperor Macrinus, and declares her grandson Elagabalus, age 14, emperor of Rome.
 June 8 – Battle of Antioch: Elagabalus defeats, with the support of the Syrian legions, the forces of Macrinus. Macrinus flees, but is captured near Chalcedon and later executed in Cappadocia.
 Diadumenianus, son of Macrinus, escapes to the Parthian court, but is captured at Zeugma and also put to death.

Asia 
 Spring – Ji Ben (or Ji Ping), Chinese court physician, plots a rebellion in the imperial capital Xu (modern-day Xuchang), but the revolt is suppressed and the conspirators are captured and executed.

By topic

Commerce 
 The silver content of the Roman denarius falls to 43 percent under the reign of Elagabalus, down from 50 percent under Septimius Severus, as he empties the treasury.
</onlyinclude>

Births 
 Gallienus, Roman emperor (d. 268)
 Yu Si, Chinese general and politician

Deaths 
 June 8 – Macrinus, Roman emperor (b. 165)
 Diadumenian, son of Macrinus (b. 208)
 Cao Zizheng, Chinese marquis and warlord
 Gu Shao, Chinese official and politician
 Ji Ben (or Ji Ping), Chinese physician
 Theoclia, Syrian Roman noblewoman
 Yue Jin (or Wenqian), Chinese general

References